Benjamin David Sheaf (born 5 February 1998) is an English footballer who plays as a midfielder for Coventry City. He has represented England at youth level.

Club career

Arsenal 
Sheaf started his youth career with the reserves of West Ham United at the age of 13, before joining the Arsenal youth setup on 2 July 2014. He earned the praise of senior team manager Arsène Wenger who said that Sheaf was "always ahead of the game". He scored his first goal for the Arsenal U19 in a 3–2 victory over Greek club Olympiacos on 29 September 2015, where he found the net in the 41st minute from the penalty spot.

In October 2015, Sheaf was invited to train with the first team, and days later he was an unused substitute in the club's 3–0 defeat against Sheffield Wednesday. He stated that, although the result was not satisfactory, the experience of being involved in the first-team was good for him as he got to "see how things are done". He made his first-team debut for Arsenal on 19 October 2017, coming on as an 89th-minute substitute for Francis Coquelin in a 1–0 victory over Red Star Belgrade in the UEFA Europa League.

Loan to Stevenage
Sheaf joined League Two side Stevenage on loan on 26 January 2018, joining the Hertfordshire club on a deal until the end of the 2017–18 season. He made his debut in a 2-0 loss against Notts County in League Two on 24 February. He made 10 appearances for the side by the end of the loan spell.

Loan to Doncaster Rovers
Sheaf joined League One side Doncaster Rovers on loan on 12 July 2019, joining the League One side for six months. He made his debut and was named in the starting line-up in a 1-1 draw against Gillingham on 3 August. His loan deal was extended until the end of the 2019–20 season on 7 January 2020. On 15 February 2020, he scored his first goal for the club in a 2-1 defeat against Gillingham in the reverse fixture. At the end, Sheaf played 38 games in all competitions for the side.

Loan to Coventry City
On 4 September 2020, Sheaf joined newly-promoted Championship side Coventry City on a season-long loan deal with the option to make the deal permanent after. He made his first appearance for the club in a 2-1 defeat against Bristol City on 12 September.

Coventry City 
Sheaf signed for Coventry City on a 3 year deal in July 2021.

International career 
Sheaf debuted for England under-16 team in the Victory Shield. As of July 2014, he has played twice for the under-16 national team. He was part of the England U18's which played a couple of friendlies against the Netherlands in September 2015. They won 2–0 in the first game which Sheaf scored a penalty and drew the second game 0–0.

Personal life
Sheaf comes from a sporting family. His mother was a top-level volleyball and beach volleyball player, and his older brother Jake is also a professional beach volleyball player. Sheaf's father was a footballer at county level, whilst his younger brother Max is a former Arsenal player and current player for Gloucester City

Career statistics

References

External links

Arsenal F.C. profile

1998 births
Living people
Sportspeople from Dartford
Footballers from Kent
English footballers
England youth international footballers
Association football midfielders
Arsenal F.C. players
Stevenage F.C. players
Doncaster Rovers F.C. players
Coventry City F.C. players
English Football League players